Jordan Howard (born January 6, 1996) is an American professional basketball player for Napoli Basket of the Italian Lega Basket Serie A (LBA). He played college basketball for Central Arkansas. He has represented Puerto Rico on the men's national basketball team.

High school career
Howard grew up in Chandler, Arizona and attended Perry High School. He is the son of Chuck Howard, who played college football at Indiana and is currently the corporate wellness administrator at Grand Canyon University. Jordan's older brother, Desmond Howard, played basketball in the junior college ranks and organizes his tenacious workouts. His younger brother, Markus Howard, was a top scorer at Marquette before turning professional. Jordan considered going to Grand Canyon for college, but opted for Central Arkansas instead.

College career
Howard was named Southland Freshman of the Year. He averaged 19.5 points per game as a junior. He had 35 points against UCLA on November 15, 2017, including the three-point bucket to force overtime. He surpassed the 2,000 point mark in a loss to Sam Houston State on January 3, 2018. On January 10, Howard set the Central Arkansas Division I record with a 41-point performance against Incarnate Word. He averaged 25.8 points per game as a senior, third in Division I. Howard is the all-time leader for three-point field goals in the Southland Conference. At the conclusion of the regular season, he was named Southland Player of the Year. Howard was a Third Team Academic All-American and graduated with a degree in filmmaking.

Professional career
After going undrafted in the 2018 NBA draft, Howard signed with the Golden State Warriors for NBA Summer League. He was selected by the Santa Cruz Warriors with the 10th pick in the 2018 NBA G League draft. He was not named to the team's final roster.

On November 25, 2018, Howard signed with the Texas Legends. He was waived on December 17.

On January 4, 2019, Howard was signed by the Raptors 905 from the G League available players pool.

On July 22, 2019, Howard signed with Goyang Orion Orions of the Korean Basketball League. He signed with the Brujos de Guayama of the Baloncesto Superior Nacional in 2020 and averaged 18.1 points and 4.1 assists per game. Howard re-signed with the team on October 3, 2021, joining them for the postseason. In the 2021 playoffs he averaged 7.5 points, 1.3 rebounds, and 2.0 assists per game.

On October 26, 2021, Howard signed with the Capitanes de Ciudad de México of the NBA G League. He scored 38 points in a 113–103 loss to the Westchester Knicks on December 22, 2021. Howard averaged 15.4 points per game, shooting 46 percent from three-point range. On February 12, 2022, he has signed with SIG Strasbourg of the French LNB Pro A.

On June 18, 2022, he has signed with Napoli Basket of the Italian Lega Basket Serie A (LBA).

National team career 
Howard was selected to represent Puerto Rico on the national team for the qualifier round for the 2023 FIBA Basketball World Cup.

Personal life
He is of Puerto Rican descent. He is the brother of Saski Baskonia guard Markus Howard.

References

External links
Central Arkansas Bears bio
 BSNPR.com profile

1996 births
Living people
21st-century African-American sportspeople
African-American basketball players
American expatriate basketball people in Canada
American expatriate basketball people in Mexico
American expatriate basketball people in South Korea
American men's basketball players
American people of Puerto Rican descent
Basketball players from Arizona
Capitanes de Ciudad de México players
Central Arkansas Bears basketball players
Napoli Basket players
Point guards
Raptors 905 players
SIG Basket players
Sportspeople from Chandler, Arizona
Texas Legends players